Peter Limbourg (born 7 July 1960) is a German broadcast journalist and the Director General of Deutsche Welle.

Career
Alongside Peter Kloeppel, Limbourg moderated the first of two TV election debates between Chancellor Gerhard Schröder and his challenger Edmund Stoiber ahead of the 2002 elections, which was aired live on two of Germany's private television channels during prime-time.

Between 2008 and 2013, Limbourg was the main presenter of daily news show SAT.1 News. In addition, he served as Editor-in-Chief of N24 (2008–2010) and as Information Director of ProSiebenSat.1 Media (2010–2013).

In September 2016, Limbourg condemned Turkey for confiscating the recording of a Deutsche Welle interview with Youth and Sports Minister Akif Çağatay Kılıç at his office in Ankara, arguing that the seizure of the video tape was "a blatant violation of press freedom." Deutsche Welle reporter Michel Friedman had asked Kılıç questions about July's attempted coup, mass layoffs and arrests that followed the failed putsch, and the media situation and the position of women in Turkey.

Other activities
 Aktion Deutschland Hilft (Germany's Relief Coalition), Member of the Board of Trustees
 Bonner Akademie für Forschung und Lehre praktischer Politik (BAPP), Member of the Board of Trustees
 Civis Media Foundation, Member of the Board of Trustees (since 2013)
 International Journalists’ Programmes (IJP), Member of the Board of Trustees
 Konrad Adenauer Prize, Member of the Advisory Board
 RIAS Berlin Commission, Co-chairman (alongside David Reinert) 
 Reporters Without Borders Germany, Member of the Board of Trustees (until 2014)

References

External links

Living people
1960 births
German television talk show hosts
German television presenters
German television journalists
German male journalists
20th-century German journalists
21st-century German journalists
Sat.1 people
Deutsche Welle